Reverend James McIntyre (1927 – December 10, 2005) was an American basketball player for the University of Minnesota from 1945–46 to 1948–49. A native of Minneapolis, Minnesota, he led Patrick Henry High School to two state championships before becoming a two-time consensus All-American at Minnesota. McIntyre is recognized as being the University of Minnesota's first true "big man." During his career, he was a two-time First Team All-Big Ten Conference and one-time Second Team All-Big Ten selection. McIntyre scored 1,223 points and had set a then-single season Minnesota scoring record of 360 points.

Despite his success on the basketball court, McIntyre was never drafted into the National Basketball Association. He spent most of his later life as a Presbyterian reverend in the Twin Cities area and died on December 10, 2005, because of an infection.

References

1927 births
2005 deaths
All-American college men's basketball players
American Presbyterian ministers
Basketball players from Minneapolis
Centers (basketball)
Minnesota Golden Gophers men's basketball players
American men's basketball players
20th-century American clergy